William Hamilton Meeks III (born 8 August 1947 in Washington, DC) is an American mathematician, specializing in differential geometry and minimal surfaces.

He was an assistant professor in 1975–1977 at the University of California, Los Angeles (UCLA), in  1977–1978 at the Instituto de Matemática Pura e Aplicada (IMPA), and in 1978–1979 at Stanford University. From 1979 to 1983 he was a professor at IMPA. He was from 1983 to 1984 a visiting member of the Institute for Advanced Study and from 1984 to 1986 a professor at Rice University with the academic year 1985–1986 spent as a visiting professor at the University of California, Santa Barbara. From 1986 to 2018 he has been the George David Birkhoff Professor of Mathematics at the University of Massachusetts, Amherst. He currently is at the Institute for Advanced Study after assuming Professor Emeritus status at UMass Amherst.

He is known as an expert on minimal surfaces and their computer graphics visualization; on the latter subject he has collaborated with David Allen Hoffman. For the academic year 2006/07 Meeks was a Guggenheim Fellow.

Selected publications
 with Shing-Tung Yau: 
 
 with Leon Simon and S.-T. Yau: 
 with S.-T. Yau: 
 with L. P. Jorge: 
 with G. Peter Scott: 
 with David Allen Hoffman: 
 with D. Hoffman: 
 
 
 with Harold Rosenberg: 
 with Joaquín Pérez: 
 with J. Pérez and Giuseppe Tinaglia:

References

External links
 Homepage
 IAS Profile

20th-century American mathematicians
21st-century American mathematicians
Differential geometers
University of California, Berkeley alumni
Instituto Nacional de Matemática Pura e Aplicada researchers
Rice University faculty
University of Massachusetts Amherst faculty
1947 births
Living people